László Varga may refer to:

 László Varga (footballer) (born 1987), Hungarian footballer
 László Varga (politician, 1979) (born 1979), Hungarian jurist and politician
 László Varga (politician, 1936) (born 1936), Hungarian Calvinist pastor and politician
 Laszlo Varga (cellist) (1924–2014), Hungarian-American cellist
 László Varga (weightlifter) (born 1953), Hungarian Olympic weightlifter